Dan Ronan is the Associate News Editor Print and Multimedia for Transport Topics, covering the trucking, freight, and logistics industry.
Ronan’s specialty is business and financial reporting. He is the anchor/producer of Transport Topics Radio, a weekly news show on SiriusXM’s Road Dog News Channel 146, which covers the trucking and overall transportation industries. He also hosts TT’s monthly video/web-based news program "Newsmakers."
A frequent panel moderator and public speaker, Ronan annually writes more than 200 stories a year for Transport Topics.
 
Ronan has been a journalist for five decades, starting professionally while a high school freshman in Chicago. At age 23, Ronan joined the Mutual Broadcasting System in Washington, D.C. as a producer/editor. Three of his five years at MBS were as the overnight Charge Editor responsible for the hourly newscasts during Larry King’s all-night talk show.

In 1988, Ronan joined CNN in Atlanta as a writer and in 1992 was promoted to on-air network correspondent concerning business and economic stories for CNN and its sister network CNN/Financial News. He has also reported for CBS NewsPath (freelance) and leading stations in Dallas (WFAA-News 8) and Atlanta (WAGA-Fox 5).

Ronan has been awarded eight Emmy Awards, two Edward R. Murrow Awards, and three AZBEE Awards for journalism excellence. His national Emmy Award was as part of CNN’s coverage of the Oklahoma City Bombing, and one of his Murrow Awards was for his reporting on the Space Shuttle Columbia disaster. He traveled to the Iraq/Kuwait border with the U.S. Army, reported from an earthquake zone along the India-Pakistan border, the White House, Congress, and twice on an NOAA Hurricane Hunter aircraft as it flew into the eye a category five hurricane. Ronan has reported from 42 of the 50 states and six foreign countries. 

Ronan worked for ten years in public relations, rising to the position of Vice President of Strategic Communications at the Intelligent Transportation Society of America. He established himself as one of the transportation industry’s experts on crisis communications being interviewed in the Wall Street Journal, New York Times, Washington Post, NBC News, CBS News, and CNN.

Ronan’s Bachelor’s Degree in Journalism is from the University of Wisconsin-Madison, and he holds a Master’s Degree from Kent State University, where he serves on the journalism school’s Professional Advisory Board.

Ronan is a commercial pilot with instrument and multi-engine ratings. He also earned two certificates in Aviation Accident Investigation Management from Embry Riddle Aeronautical University. 

For 15 years, Ronan was an NCAA baseball umpire and small college and high school basketball official. Ronan completed professional baseball umpire training at the Joe Brinkman Umpire School.  Ronan resides in suburban Washington, D.C.

References

1959 births
Living people
University of Wisconsin–Madison School of Journalism & Mass Communication alumni
American television reporters and correspondents
Kent State University alumni
Commercial aviators